Esteban Vidal (c. 1800 – c. 1880) was Mayor of Ponce, Puerto Rico, from 1 July 1849 to 30 September 1849.

Introduction to political life
In 1852, Vidal was one of seven assemblymen at the Ponce Municipal Assembly.

See also

 List of Puerto Ricans
 List of mayors of Ponce, Puerto Rico

References

Further reading
 Ramon Marin. Las Fiestas Populares de Ponce. Editorial Universidad de Puerto Rico. 1994.

External links
 Guardia Civil española (c. 1898) (Includes military ranks in 1880s Spanish Empire.)

Mayors of Ponce, Puerto Rico
1800s births
1880s deaths
Year of death uncertain
Year of birth uncertain